The 1900 World Allround Speed Skating Championships took place at 24 and 25 February 1900 at the ice rinks Frognerkilen in Kristiania (Today: Oslo), Norway. The first day was skated at the ice rink Friedenauer Sportplatz (a 400 m ice rink). Due to the bad ice conditions the second day the distances were skated at the ice rink Westeisbahn (a 335 m ice rink).

Peder Østlund was the defending champion, after 2 distances he stopped.
Edvard Engelsaas won three distances and became the new World champion.

Allround results 

  * = Fell
 NC = Not classified
 NF = Not finished
 NS = Not started
 DQ = Disqualified
Source: SpeedSkatingStats.com

Rules 
Four distances have to be skated:
 500m
 1500m
 5000m
 10000m

One could only win the World Championships by winning at least three of the four distances, so there would be no World Champion if no skater won at least three distances.

Silver and bronze medals were not awarded.

References 

World Allround Speed Skating Championships, 1900
1900 World Allround
World Allround, 1900
International sports competitions in Oslo
1900 in Norwegian sport
February 1900 sports events
1900s in Oslo